The First Five Years is a Canadian informational television series which aired on CBC Television from 1971 to 1974.

Premise
The series concerns children younger than school age. Lloyd Robertson and Bette Stephenson were hosts for the first two seasons which aired locally on CBLT Toronto. Its third season was broadcast on the national network with Harry Brown replacing Robertson as a regular host.

Scheduling
The half-hour series was initially produced as a local programme for CBLT on Wednesday afternoons from 4 October 1971 until 9 May 1973. It was broadcast nationally Thursdays at 2:30 p.m. for one season from 4 October 1973 to 9 May 1974.

References

External links
 

CBC Television original programming
1971 Canadian television series debuts
1974 Canadian television series endings